Abel Redenut (born 17 April 1995) is a Papua New Guinean footballer who plays as a defender for Madang in the Papua New Guinea National Soccer League and the Papua New Guinea national football team.

Early years
Redenut, who is born of mixed Oro and Morobe parentage, started playing soccer at the St. Joseph International School in Port Moresby. Apart from soccer, Redenut has played schoolboys rugby union but upon recollection, decided to focus his energy on football.

Club career
Redenut started his career with Besta United PNG which is the national development team of the Papua New Guinea Football Association. In 2014, just before the 2014 OFC U-20 Championship he joined Port Moresby. In 2016, he joined Mungkas. After two seasons with Mungkas he joined Madang to play for them in the 2018 OFC Champions League.

International career
Redenut progressed through the national teams of PNG, from the U17's up to the national team. In 2015 Redenut was part of the Papua New Guinea national under-23 football team which won a bronze medal at the 2015 Pacific Games.
Redenut made his debut for the national team on March 23, 2017, in their 2–1 loss against Tahiti.

References

External links
 
 

Living people
1995 births
Association football midfielders
Papua New Guinea international footballers
Papua New Guinean footballers